Although the first Khmer TV soap opera was broadcast in 1996, the number of Cambodian soap operas rose in 2007 after Kone Prosa Srey proved a success on CTN. 85 Khmer soap operas have been broadcast between 1997 and 2012.

1997 
Cheat Satrey (SSB CO., LTD) (CTN/Ch7)

1998 
Bopha Pailin (MTR CO., LTD) (CTN/Ch7)

2003 
Ngea Chea Propun Head-Wife (FCI CO., LTD) (CTN)

2004 
Ruos Cheat Jivit (KMF CO., LTD) (Ch5)
Srov Krao Srae (Mohahong CO., LTD) (Ch3)

2005 
Avei Avei Knhom Tveu Daumbei Oun (KH CO, LTD) (CTN)
Komlang Nung Veasna (KH CO, LTD) (CTN)

2006 
Banhau Kaék (Rock CO., LTD) (CTN)
Beh Dong Rung Kruoh (Rock CO., LTD) (CTN)
Chet Sava (Rock CO., LTD) (CTN)
Knung Duong Jet Mean Neakna (Spark CO., LTD) (Ch7)
Kone Prosa Srey (Rock CO., LTD) (CTN)
Mean Sombuk Tae Rongea (Rock/KH CO., LTD) (CTN)
Phjus jevit yuk vak vey (Spark CO., LTD) (Ch7)
Pjouh Jivit Yuvekvei (Spark CO., LTD) (Ch7)
 Snam Snae Samut Ream (Rock/KH CO., LTD) (CTN)
Trung Meas Baksei Snaeh (Spark CO., LTD) (Ch7)

2007 
After The Rain (Mohahong CO., LTD) (Ch3)
Dung Te Ta Knhom Rung Jam Neak? (Spark CO., LTD) (Ch7)
Jet Bun (WMC CO., LTD) (CTN)
Kae Jet Saóp Bong (Spark CO., LTD) (Ch7)
Ku Snae Chai Don (Classic CO., LTD) (Ch5)
Knhom Chea Neak Na (Who Am I?) (Rock CO., LTD) (CTN)
Majah Beh Duong (Rock CO., LTD) (CTN)
Mon Sneah Srok Srea (FCI/Town CO., LTD) (Ch5)
Pka Knong Pka (Rock CO., LTD) (CTN)
Pka Maóm (Mohahong CO., LTD) (Ch7)
Samut Tuk Sap (WMC CO., LTD) (CTN)
Somnanh Jivit (WMC CO., LTD) (CTN)
Tuk Pnek Jeay Daen (Rock CO., LTD) (CTN)

2008 
The Golden Vine (Spark CO., LTD) (Ch7)
Jomnong Sneah Jomnong Besdoung (KH CO., LTD) (CTN)
Neang Sonita (Spark CO., LTD) (Ch7)
Phum Sneah Cherngprey (Spark CO., LTD) (Ch7)
Pka Reik 4 Rodov (KH CO., LTD) (CTN)
Reachany Duong Chet (Rock CO., LTD) (CTN)
Tngai Alai Oun (Spark CO., LTD) (Ch7)

2009 
Duong Vitey Dara (Rock CO., LTD) (CTN)
Jomrieng Snae Rolok Jivit (Classic CO., LTD) (Ch5)
Junjung Kmean Sromoul (KMF CO., LTD) (Ch5)
Mek Jah Jan Tmei (WMC CO., LTD) (CTN)
Onloung Knong Barp (Mohahong/SSB CO., LTD) (Ch7)
Oudom Pheakriyea (Rock CO., LTD) (CTN)
Pesakkam Dontrei (WMC CO., LTD) (CTN)
Peus Sneah (Mohahong/SSB CO., LTD) (Ch7)
Pume Knhom Sros Chaut Chai (Spark CO., LTD) (Ch7)
Tream Jet Somrap Cheu (Spark CO., LTD) (Ch7)

2010 
Besdoung Kyom Somrap Neak Na? (Spark CO., LT) (Ch7)
Ham Sen Mun Snea (Spark CO., LTD) (Ch7)
Janh Jet Tbet Srolanh (Spark CO., LTD) (Ch7)
Klen Pka Srotob 3 (Spark CO., LTD) (Ch7)
Lamom Heuy Lok Pdey (Classic CO., LTD) (Ch5)
Lbech Srey (Rock CO., LTD) (CTN)
Leak Sneah Somrab Bong (Sunday CO., LTD) (Ch7)
Oun Chea Besdoung Bong (Rock CO., LTD) (CTN)
Phka Reik Phen Rodov (MTR CO., LTD) (Ch6)
Rolok Somleng Part 1 (KMF CO., LTD) (CTN)
Songkream Sneah (Mohahong CO., LTD) (Ch5)
Tevabot Nirouk (Mohahong CO., LTD) (Ch3)
Vimean Snea Prea Rouk (Town CO., LTD) (Ch5)

2011
Boross Vey Steel (Town CO., LTD) (Ch5)
Brer Jivit Kit Dol Oun (Sunday CO., LTD) (Ch7)
Ja'et Chet (Mohahong CO., LTD) (Ch3)
Jiveath Youkvakvey (SON CO., LTD) (Ch6)
Kam Loukei (Classic CO., LTD) (Ch5)
Oundom Doung Chet (MTR/SON CO., LTD) (Ch6)
Pourp Somnang (Rock Co., LTD) (CTN)
Pov Chouk Sor (Town CO., LTD) (Ch5)
Somross Jivith (KMF CO., LTD) (CTN)
Tirk Chet Bong Srey (Rock CO., LTD) (CTN)
Tirk Phneak Hor Khmean Neak Jout (Sunday CO., LTD) (Ch7)
Vihean Sneah Athkombang (Sunday CO., LTD) (Ch7)

2012

NEW WAVES FOR KHMER INDUSTRIES

3Seathey Vey khmeang (Classic CO., LTD) (Ch5)
Aek Komdor Bong Sneah (Sunday CO., LTD) (Ch7)
Besdoung Kyom Krousa Kyom (KMF CO., LTD) (CTN)
Besdoung Neak Kaphear (Rock CO., LTD) (CTN)
Chouk Sor Dos Leur Pouk (Town CO., LTD) (Ch5)
Chun Atkombang - the Imposter (KMF CO., LTD) (CTN)
Deak Somleang Jet (Sunday CO., LTD) (Ch7)
Dechor Yorth (Punlir Preah Athit CO., LTD) (Ch6)
Hong Antheak Sneah (SonSun CO., LTD) (Ch6)
Jivith douch Lokear (NewMoon) (MoomMai CO., LTD) (Ch6)
Jivith Ler Vithey (MTR CO., LTD) (Ch6)
Komloss Leur Ker (Town CO., LTD) (Ch5)
Kompoul DoungJet (SonSun/MTR CO., LTD) (Ch6)
Majaus Komnum Maujaus Sneah (Mohahong CO., LTD) (Ch5)
Moha Tikun (Sunday CO., LTD) (Ch7)
Nisai Sneah Pi Jeat (Rock CO., LTD) (CTN)
Obataheat Sneah (Mohahong CO., LTD) (Ch5)
Pesakakam Kumpoul Sneah 3 Dourng (Town CO., LTD) (Ch5)
Pich Knong Besdoung (Mohahong CO., LTD) (Ch5)
Pkha Reak Knong Jet (Rock CO., LTD) (CTN)
Preah Athit Reas Knong Seoul (HANSON CO., LTD) (Ch7)
Prumden Bondoul Jet Sneah (SUNDAY/SPARK CO., LTD) (Ch7)
Reachany Panjapor (Punlir Preah Athit CO., LTD) (Ch6)
Soben Yukvakvey (KMF CO., LTD) (CTN)

2013

3D Khmer Soap Opera

See also
 Mass media in Cambodia
 List of Khmer entertainment companies
 List of Khmer film actors
 List of Khmer film directors
 List of Khmer films

References

External links 
 Films from Cambodia at the Internet Movie Database
 Khmer-language films at the Internet Movie Database
 Filmography of Norodom Sihanouk

Soap opera